Rivignano was a comune (municipality) in the Province of Udine in the Italian region Friuli-Venezia Giulia, located about  northwest of Trieste and about  southwest of Udine.  

Since January 1, 2014 Rivignano has been merged with Teor, forming a new municipality called Rivignano Teor.

References

 

Cities and towns in Friuli-Venezia Giulia